The Gang's All Here is a 1943 American Twentieth Century Fox Technicolor musical film starring Alice Faye, Carmen Miranda and James Ellison. The film, directed and choreographed by Busby Berkeley, is known for its use of musical numbers with fruit hats. Included among the 10 highest-grossing films of that year, it was at that time Fox's most expensive production.

Musical highlights include Carmen Miranda performing an insinuating, witty version of "You Discover You're in New York" that lampoons fads, fashions, and wartime shortages of the time. The film features Miranda's "The Lady in the Tutti Frutti Hat" which, because of its sexual innuendo (dozens of scantily clad women handling very large bananas), apparently prevented the film from being shown in Brazil on its initial release. In the US, the censors dictated that the chorus girls must hold the bananas at the waist and not at the hip. Alice Faye sings "A Journey to a Star," "No Love, No Nothin'," and the surreal finale "The Polka-Dot Polka."

The film was nominated for an Academy Award for Best Art Direction-Interior Decoration, Color (James Basevi, Joseph C. Wright, Thomas Little). It was the last musical Faye made as a Hollywood superstar. She was pregnant with her second daughter during filming. In 2014, The Gang's All Here was deemed "culturally, historically, or aesthetically significant" by the Library of Congress and selected for preservation in the National Film Registry.

Plot
A man sings "Brazil" as the opening credits fade to the disembarkation of a ship, SS Brazil. As the exotic goods are netted off the ship the camera pans down to the archetypal exotic fruit hat on Carmen Miranda who reprises the song.

Wealthy businessman Andrew J. "A. J." Mason Sr. takes his nervous partner, Peyton Potter, to the Club New Yorker for a celebratory evening with his son, Sgt. Andrew J. Mason Jr., who is about to report for active duty in the Army. A. J. and Andy enjoy the show, which features master of ceremonies Phil Baker and dancer Tony De Marco, while Potter worries about what his wife Blossom would say if she knew he was there. While Potter is trapped into dancing with Brazilian sensation Dorita, Andy becomes intrigued by entertainer Eadie Allen. Phil warns Andy that because Eadie dances at the Broadway Canteen between shows, she will not go out on a date with him, but Andy follows her to the canteen and tells her that his name is Sgt. Pat Casey so that she will not be intimidated by his wealth. Despite her insistence that she cannot date servicemen outside the canteen, Eadie is charmed by Andy and agrees to meet him later when he pursues her to the nightclub. Eadie and Andy spend the evening talking and falling in love, and the next day, Eadie bids him farewell at the train station and promises to write every day.

Andy distinguishes himself in battle in the South Pacific, and is granted a furlough after being awarded a medal. A. J. is thrilled and plans to throw a welcome home party for Andy at the Club New Yorker. Phil cannot accommodate his plans, however, as the club is closed for two weeks while the company rehearses a new show. Munificent as always, A. J. invites the performers to rehearse at his and Potter's homes, where they can throw a lavish garden party and war bond rally to welcome Andy. Potter is perturbed about the arrangements when he learns that Blossom knows Phil from her former days as an entertainer, and his chagrin grows when Tony's partner cannot perform and he asks Potter's daughter Vivian to dance with him. Hoping to persuade the stodgy Potter to allow Vivian to perform, Blossom tells him that Phil has threatened to reveal her wild past if Vivian is not in the show. Potter acquiesces, but his problems grow when he is pursued by the romantic-minded Dorita. When not chasing Potter, Dorita learns that Vivian has a boyfriend named Andy, and that he and Eadie's "Casey" are the same man.

Complications arise as Dorita tries to keep Vivian and Eadie from discovering Andy's deception. When Andy and the real Pat Casey arrive at the club, however, Eadie learns the truth. Andy proclaims that he wants to marry her and not Vivian, but Eadie insists on breaking off their relationship, as she believes that Vivian really cares for him. During the show, however, Vivian tells Eadie that she is going to Broadway to perform as Tony's permanent partner, and reveals that she and Andy were never truly in love. As the show comes to a close, Eadie and Andy reconcile, and everyone joins in the final song.

Cast

Production

The working title of this film was The Girls He Left Behind. According to a January 7, 1943 news item, composer Harry Warren was originally scheduled to work with lyricist Mack Gordon on the film's score, but Warren instead wrote the picture's songs with Leo Robin. A news in The Hollywood Reporter on 30 March 1943 included "Pickin' on Your Momma" in the list of songs to be featured in the film. Modern sources note that the song, along with "Sleepy Moon" and "Drums and Dreams" were cut before the final release. According to The Hollywood Reporter and a studio press release, Linda Darnell was originally scheduled to play "Vivian Potter," which would have been her first dancing role in motion pictures. During dance rehearsals, however, Darnell sprained her ankle, and after her recovery, eloped with cinematographer Peverell Marley and asked Twentieth Century-Fox for an indefinite leave of absence. Darnell was replaced in the role by Sheila Ryan.

The Gang's All Here began production in April 1943. Berkeley learned that Darryl F. Zanuck would not be overseeing the production. Fox's studio head was in Europe on behalf of the war effort, leaving the chore to William LeBaron, a producer and songwriter who had worked at other studios before coming to Fox. Under Zanuck, he set up an independent unit at the studio, mostly making musicals. He and Berkeley got along well at first, but the relationship soon was strained as the showman in Berkeley would not yield to the budget-trimming mandates of LeBaron (who, in turn, was forced to trim expenses due to the demands of the War Production Board, which sought cost cutting in all aspects of businesses during the war). In spite of the producer/director discord during shooting, the film turned out to be an outrageously conceived work of art, blending with subtlety the politics of alliances while overtly disarming the viewing public with surrealism and spectacle.

Although Alice Faye did have a singing cameo in the 1944 film Four Jills in a Jeep, this picture marked her last appearance in a musical film until State Fair (1962). Faye, who was pregnant with her second child during filming of The Gang's All Here, retired from the screen and only made one film in the intervening period, the drama Fallen Angel (1945). The Gang's All Here marked the screen debuts of actresses June Haver (1926–2005), Jeanne Crain (1925–2003) and Jo-Carroll Dennison, who was Miss America of 1942. According to an article in the Los Angeles Times, the film was to include a parody of Phil Baker's radio show Take It or Leave It. The sequence was cut, and Baker instead made an entire film based on the show, called Take It or Leave It, for Twentieth Century-Fox. 
       
The Gang's All Here was the first color film entirely directed by Berkeley (he had earlier directed dance numbers for the 1930 two-color Technicolor film Whoopee!), and the extravagant production numbers were well received. While praising Berkeley's work, the MPH reviewer commented that the production numbers "are opulent in highly effective color combinations and are climaxed by a finale in the cubistic and modernistic tempo which is different from anything that has passed this reviewer's way since some of the abstract treatments employed by Walt Disney's Fantasia." Although some modern sources indicate that the film was banned in Brazil because of the giant bananas featured in "The Lady with Tutti-Frutti Hat" number, the film's file in the Motion Picture Production Code Collection at the AMPAS Library contained no information about censorship in Brazil and the film was approved for export to South American countries. The picture received an Academy Award nomination in the Art Direction (Color) category.

Jazz drummer Louie Bellson appears uncredited in the Benny Goodman Orchestra while Carmen Miranda sings "Paducah".

Soundtrack

 "Hail, Hail, the Gang's All Here"
 Music by Theodore Morse and Arthur Sullivan
 Lyrics by Dolly Morse (as D.A. Esrom)
 "Brazil" ("Aquarela do Brasil")
 Music by Ary Barroso
 English lyrics by S.K. Russell
 Sung by Nestor Amaral, Carmen Miranda and chorus
 "You Discover You're in New York"
 Music by Harry Warren
 Lyrics by Leo Robin
 Performed by Carmen Miranda, Alice Faye, Phil Baker and chorus
 "Minnie's in the Money"
 Music by Harry Warren
 Lyrics by Leo Robin
 Arranged by Eddie Sauter
 Sung by Benny Goodman with his band and a jitterbug chorus
 "Soft Winds"
 Written by Benny Goodman (instrumental)
 Played by Benny Goodman and His Orchestra
 Danced by Alice Faye and James Ellison
 "The Lady in the Tutti Frutti Hat"
 Music by Harry Warren
 Lyrics by Leo Robin
 Performed by Carmen Miranda and chorus
 "A Journey to a Star"
 Music by Harry Warren
 Lyrics by Leo Robin
 Sung by Alice Faye (and reprised by cast)
 Danced by Tony De Marco and Sheila Ryan
 "The Jitters"
 Music by Gene Rose
 Played by Benny Goodman and His Orchestra
 Danced by Charlotte Greenwood and Charles Saggau
 "No Love, No Nothin"
 Music by Harry Warren
 Lyrics by Leo Robin
 Arranged by Benny Carter
 Sung by Alice Faye
 Danced by Tony De Marco and Sheila Ryan
 "(I've Got a Gal in) Kalamazoo"
 Music by Harry Warren
 Lyrics by Mack Gordon
 Played by Benny Goodman and his band
 "Paducah"
 Music by Harry Warren
 Lyrics by Leo Robin
 Played by Benny Goodman and His Orchestra
 Sung by Benny Goodman and Carmen Miranda
 Danced by Carmen Miranda and Tony De Marco
 "The Polka Dot Polka"
 Music by Harry Warren
 Lyrics by Leo Robin
 Sung by Alice Faye with dancers
 "The Polka Dot Ballet"
 Music by Harry Warren
 Performed by Busby Berkeley dancers
 "A Hot Time in the Old Town"
 Music by Theo. A. Metz
 "Silent Señorita"
 Music by Harry Warren
 Lyrics by Leo Robin
 "Valse des rayons" from Le Papillon aka "Valse chaloupée"
 Music by Jacques Offenbach
 "P'ra Que Discutir"
 Written by Nestor Amaral
 "Diga o Ella"
 Written by Nestor Amaral
 "Let's Dance"
 Written by Gregory Stone, Josef Bonime and Fanny Baldridge.

Release 
The film was released on December 24, 1943. The Gang's All Here it became one of the 25 top-grossing films of 1943–44.

Critical reception 
Most of the reviewers were positive with the exception of the critic for The New York Times, who observed a Freudian slant to Berkeley's giant bananas: "But in the main, The Gang's All Here is a series of lengthy and lavish production numbers all arranged by Busby Berkeley as if money was no object but titillation was. Mr. Berkeley has some sly notions under his busby. One or two of his dance spectacles seem to stem straight from Freud and, if interpreted, might bring a rosy blush to several cheeks in the Hays office."

Philip French wrote in the London Observer: "The movie provides an escape from wartime anxieties and austerities into an extravagant, fantastical world, most spectacularly in what James Agee called Berkeley's 'paroxysmic production numbers” involving Miranda'." James Agee, said about the movie: "There is one routine with giant papier-mache bananas, cutting to thighs, then feet, then rows of toes, which deserves to survive in every casebook of blatant film surreptition for the next century."

The MPH reviewer commented that the production numbers "are opulent in highly effective color combinations and are climaxed by a finale in the cubistic and modernistic tempo which is different from anything that has passed this reviewer's way since some of the abstract treatments employed by Walt Disney's Fantasia." Wanda Hale of the New York Daily News wrote: "It's colossal, it's stupendous, and one of the artiest productions ever made... It is a Technicolor dream that takes on nightmarish proportions or the aspects of a Dali drawing in motion." "Whatever this film is, exactly, it is worth seeing", wrote Michael Phillips of the Chicago Tribune.

"Busby Berkeley's most audacious film—an exploration of the possibilities of movement and color that moves into the realm of pure abstraction. The sexual symbolism is at its most blatant, what can you say about a film that features 60 girls waving gigantic bananas?" wrote critic Don Druker for the newspaper Chicago Reader.

“It's a very unusual movie, there's nothing like it. It's a routine 1940s musical with a corny wartime romantic plot, but it's got these astounding, surrealistic production numbers by Busby Berkeley. People were overwhelmed seeing it in color in the ’70s.” said Eric Spilker for the New York Post.

"Busby Berkeley's first in colour, reaching some sort of apotheosis in vulgarity with Carmen Miranda's 'Lady in the Tutti-Frutti Hat' accompanied by a parade of chorines manipulating outsize bananas," highlighted the magazine Time Out.

"A weak script is somewhat relegated by the flock of tuneful musical numbers that frequently punctuate the picture," said Variety.

Awards and honors 
16th Academy Awards (1944) 
Best Art Direction-Interior Decoration, Color (Nominated)

National Film Registry (2014)
In 2014, The Gang's All Here was deemed "culturally, historically, or aesthetically significant" by the Library of Congress and selected for preservation in the National Film Registry.

The film is recognized by American Film Institute in these lists:
 2004: AFI's 100 Years...100 Songs:
 "The Lady in the Tutti-Frutti Hat" – Nominated
 2006: AFI's Greatest Movie Musicals – Nominated

Home video
Never released on VHS, The Gang's All Here first appeared on LaserDisc in 1997 from 20th Century Fox Home Entertainment. Fox first released the film on DVD in 2007 as part of The Alice Faye Collection, but the transfer was criticized for its faded color reproduction  subduing the original vibrant Technicolor hues. It was rereleased on DVD in 2008 as part of Fox's The Carmen Miranda Collection; this edition contained a brighter and more colorful transfer.

In 2014, Eureka Entertainment in the UK released the film on a region B Blu-ray as part of their Masters of Cinema series. This edition preserved the vibrant color scheme. In 2016, Twilight Time in the US released a region 0, limited edition Blu-ray of 3,000 units. Though also fully restored, it utilized a much duller, darker transfer than the Eureka.

References

External links

 
 
 The Gang's All Here at NNDB
 
 

1943 films
1943 musical films
20th Century Fox films
American musical films
Films directed by Busby Berkeley
United States National Film Registry films
1940s English-language films
1940s American films